or skinship, written  in Japanese syllabaries, is an idea in Japanese culture.  It is the idea of spending time together naked.  Hadaka no tsukiai friendships are platonic rather than sexual.

A family, a group of housewives from the same neighborhood, a group of businessmen, or a group of classmates might spend time together naked at a sentō bathhouse, at an onsen hot spring, or at a health club.  This allows opportunities for social bonding.

References

Japanese culture
Nudity